Rothenburger Straße station is a Nuremberg U-Bahn station, located on the U2 and U3. When traveling in a  southerly direction it is the last station to be served by both U2 and U3. The station is connected to the Nürnberg Rothenburgerstraße station of the Nuremberg S-Bahn

References

Nuremberg U-Bahn stations
Railway stations in Germany opened in 1984
1984 establishments in West Germany